Joseph Wheeler Sewell (October 9, 1898 – March 6, 1990) was an American professional baseball infielder who played in Major League Baseball for the Cleveland Indians and New York Yankees from 1920 to 1933. He was elected to the Baseball Hall of Fame in 1977.

Sewell was a member of two World Series-winning teams. He holds the record for the lowest strikeout rate in major league history, striking out on average only once every 73 plate appearances, and the most consecutive games without a strikeout, at 115.

Career

Born in Titus, Alabama, Sewell lettered in college football at the University of Alabama in 1917, 1918, and 1919.  He led the school baseball team to four conference titles before joining the minor league New Orleans Pelicans in 1920, where he played a partial season before being called up to the "big league".

Sewell made his major league debut mid-season in 1920 with the World Series champion Cleveland Indians shortly after shortstop Ray Chapman was killed by a pitch from the Yankees’ Carl Mays in August and became the team's full-time shortstop the following year. An emerging star, Sewell batted .318 with 101 runs, 93 RBIs and a .412 on-base percentage in 1921.

Sewell's patience and daily work ethic became his hallmarks over the following decade and a half. Playing with Cleveland until 1930 and the New York Yankees from 1931 to 1933, Sewell batted .312 with 1,141 runs, 1,054 RBI, 436 doubles, 68 triples, 49 home runs, 842 bases on balls and a .391 on-base percentage. He regularly scored 90 or more runs a season and twice topped the 100 RBI plateau in 1923 and '24. He hit a career-high 11 home runs in 1932.

Sewell struck out 114 times in 7,132 career at-bats for an average of one strikeout every 62.5 at-bats, second only to Willie Keeler (63.1). He also holds the modern single-season record for fewest strikeouts over a full season, with 3, set in 1932.  Sewell also had 3 strikeouts in 1930, albeit in just 353 at-bats (as opposed to 503 in his record-setting year), as well as three other full seasons (1925, 1929, 1933) with 4 strikeouts.  He struck out ten or more times in only four seasons, and his highest strikeout total was 20, during the 1922 season. For his 1925–1933 seasons, Sewell struck out 4, 6, 7, 9, 4, 3, 8, 3, and 4 times.  He also holds the record for consecutive games without recording a strikeout, at 115.

Sewell also played in 1,103 consecutive games, which to that point was second only to Everett Scott.

 His 167.7 at-bats per strikeout in 1932 is still a single-season record.

According to his obituary published in The New York Times, he played his entire Major League career using only one bat (a 40-ouncer he dubbed "Black Betsy."), which he kept in shape by rubbing with a Coke bottle and seasoning with chewing tobacco.

Sewell played in two World Series, in 1920 and 1932, winning both times. His 1977 induction into the Baseball Hall of Fame was by the Veterans Committee. In 1981, Lawrence Ritter and Donald Honig included him in their book The 100 Greatest Baseball Players of All Time. (He joined the Indians' roster after September 1 in 1920 and normally would not have been eligible to participate in post-season play, but Wilbert Robinson, manager of the Brooklyn Robins, waived the rule because of the circumstances with Chapman.)

Personal

Two of his brothers, Luke and Tommy, also played major league baseball. Tommy played in one game with the Chicago Cubs in 1927, and Luke played for four teams over 20 years and, as manager of the St. Louis Browns, led the team to its only pennant in 1944. His cousin Rip Sewell was a major league pitcher credited with inventing the eephus pitch.

Joe Sewell was a member of Pi Kappa Phi fraternity. Sewell-Thomas Stadium, the baseball stadium at the University of Alabama, is named in his honor and is nicknamed by Crimson Tide fans as "The Joe". After his retirement, Sewell worked as a public relations man for a dairy and was a major league scout.

In 1964, at the age of 66, he became the Alabama baseball coach, achieving a 114–99 record in seven seasons. 

One of his pitchers was future NFL standout, Alabama quarterback and 1966 MLB 10th round draftee (Yankees) Ken "The Snake" Stabler.

Death
Sewell died on March 6, 1990, aged 91, in Mobile, Alabama. He was the last surviving member of the 1920 World Champion Cleveland Indians.

Posthumously, Sewell's community (Elmore County) has established a scholarship award recognizing local high school seniors who exhibit Christian character, leadership in their community, strong academic standing, and athletic achievements. Sewell graduated from Wetumpka High School in 1916.

See also

 List of Major League Baseball individual streaks
 Major League Baseball consecutive games played streaks
 List of Major League Baseball career hits leaders
 List of Major League Baseball career doubles leaders
 List of Major League Baseball career runs scored leaders
 List of Major League Baseball career runs batted in leaders
 List of Major League Baseball annual doubles leaders

References

External links

Joe Sewell at SABR (Baseball BioProject)
Interview with Joe Sewell conducted by Eugene Murdock, August 8, 1977, in Tuscaloosa, Alabama, in 3 parts (2 hours 10 minutes): Part 1 of 3, Part 2 of 3, Part 3 of 3

1898 births
1990 deaths
Major League Baseball shortstops
National Baseball Hall of Fame inductees
Cleveland Indians players
Cleveland Indians scouts
New York Yankees players
New York Yankees coaches
Alabama Crimson Tide baseball players
Alabama Crimson Tide football players
People from Elmore County, Alabama
Baseball players from Alabama
National College Baseball Hall of Fame inductees